Time Machine is a progressive rock album released in July 1988 by Rick Wakeman. The album features guest vocals from Roy Wood.The timings are for the CD release on which 5 tracks were extended versions from the LP edition. LP timings for the extended tracks are: "Angel of Time" (4.38), "Slaveman" (5.05), "Open Up Your Eyes" (5.48), "Make Me a Woman" (4.57) and "Rock Age" (7.48).

Track listing
All tracks composed and arranged by Rick Wakeman
 "Custer's Last Stand" - 4:05  
 "Ocean City" - 4:04  
 "Angel of Time" - 4:51 
 "Slaveman" - 6:44  
 "Ice" - 4:52 
 "Open Up Your Eyes" - 9:57  
 "Elizabethan Rock" - 3:14  
 "Make Me A Woman" - 5:01  
 "Rock Age" - 8:37

Personnel
 Rick Wakeman - keyboards 
 David Paton - bass 
 Tony Fernandez - drums, percussion 
 Ashley Holt - vocals (4 & 8)
 John Knightsbridge - guitar (4 & 9)
 John Parr - vocals (2 & 9)
 Roy Wood - vocals (1)
 Tracy Ackerman - vocals (3, 5 & 6)
Technical
 John Burns - engineer

References

Rick Wakeman albums
1988 albums